West St Leonards railway station is on the Hastings line in the south of England and is one of four stations that serve Hastings, East Sussex. It is  down the line from London Charing Cross. The station and all trains serving it are operated by Southeastern.

History 
West St Leonards station was constructed in 1887. It is just north of St Leonards West Marina railway station, a now disused station that was the earliest station serving the area.

Rail layout 

The Hastings Line (operated by Southeastern) joins the East Coastway Line (operated by Southern) immediately east of West St Leonards, at Bo-Peep junction, just before entering Bo-Peep tunnel. Plans were made for platforms to be built on the East Coastway Line for interchange but Hastings Borough Council decided that there was no economic or passenger benefit as interchange was already available at the next station (Warrior Square).

Services 
All services at West St Leonards are operated by Southeastern using  EMUs.

The typical off-peak service in trains per hour is:
 1 tph to London Charing Cross via 
 1 tph to 

During the peak hours, the station is served by additional services between London Charing Cross and Hastings, increasing the service to 2 tph in each direction.

References

External links

Transport in Hastings
Railway stations in East Sussex
DfT Category E stations
Former South Eastern Railway (UK) stations
Railway stations in Great Britain opened in 1887
Railway stations served by Southeastern